Selene Nunatak is a nunatak (an exposed, often rocky element of a ridge, mountain, or peak not covered with ice or snow) rising to about 1,200 m west of Lunar Crag, situated within the mountain range Planet Heights, in eastern Alexander Island, Antarctica. The nunatak was named in association with nearby Lunar Crag by the United Kingdom Antarctic Place-Names Committee in 1988 after Selene, the Greek goddess of the Moon.

See also 

 Admirals Nunatak
 Figaro Nunatak
 Lizard Nunatak

Further reading 
 David J. Cantrill, Imogen Poole, The Vegetation of Antarctica Through Geological Time, P 171
 David J. Cantrill & Morag A. Hunter (2005), Macrofossil floras of the Latady Basin, Antarctic Peninsula, New Zealand Journal of Geology and Geophysics, 48:3, 537–553, DOI: 10.1080/00288306.2005.9515132
 Simon R. A. Kelly, New Trigonioid Bivalves from the Early Jurassic to Earliest Cretaceous of the Antarctic Peninsula Region: Systematics and Austral Paleobiogeography,  Journal of Paleontology, vol. 69, no. 1, 1995, pp. 66–84. JSTOR, www.jstor.org/stable/1306280. Accessed 31 Jan. 2020
 Doubleday, P. & Macdonald, David & Nell, P.. (1993), Sedimentology and structure of the trench-slope to forearc basin transition in the Mesozoic of Alexander Island, Antarctica,  Geological Magazine. 130. 737 - 754. 10.1017/S0016756800023128

External links 

 Selene Nunatak on USGS website
 Selene Nunatak on AADC website
 Selene Nunatak on SCAR website
 Selene Nunatak on mindat.org

References 

Nunataks of Alexander Island